Barra brava is the name of organized supporters' groups of football teams in Latin America, analogous to European ultras and British hooligans in providing fanatical support to their clubs in stadiums and provoking violence against rival fans as well as against the police.

Actions such as exhibition of choreographies (like throwing smoke bombs, firecrackers, confetti and balloons and displaying giant flags that cover entire stands, or part of them, before the match's start) to welcome the team when it goes out to the pitch; waving and displaying of flags, banners and umbrellas; and coordination of chants (that accompany playing bass drums and trumpets and end up being sung by part or the rest of their team's crowd in the stadium while jumping or applauding) during the whole match, are characteristic of their fervent behavior, whose purpose is to encourage their team while intimidating referees and rival fans and players, for which they also provoke violence.

They also look to attack rival fans (especially rival barras bravas), which leads to fights with them (most of the time outside of stadiums before or after matches, but sometimes during them in the stands), and defend the rest of their team' spectators from rival attacks (especially in away matches, where normally they are outnumbered by home fans) and police repression.
These groups originated in Argentina in the 1950s and spread throughout the rest of Latin America. They are similar to hooligan firms (from United Kingdom), torcidas organizadas (from Brazil) and ultras (originally from Italy but spread to the most part of Europe and Asia, Australia and North Africa).

History 
During the 1920s in Argentina, irregular groups of fervent fans spontaneously began to appear at football matches. These groups were denominated as barras by the media, a term that in Rioplatense Spanish slang is equivalent to the term gang, but in its original meaning (not necessarily associated to crime), that is 'an informal group of people (usually friends) who meet frequently and usually do common activities'. Their actions were limited to stadiums during home matches because they couldn't follow (at least the whole members) their teams to other cities very often, neither was violence provocation their objective, as violence arose spontaneously due to frustration caused by bad results of their team or as a way to influence the match through intimidation of rival players and referees with insults, throwing objects and occasionally entering onto the pitch to assault them. Sometimes they also attacked rival fans (usually barras also) who used the same methods against their team. At the end of this decade, a few newspapers described one of this groups as a barra "brava" (Spanish for fierce), appearing the words barra brava together for the first time, but not yet like a term.

One of those groups, named  La barra de la Goma ("The barra of the rubber") by the press, appeared in 1927 and supported San Lorenzo de Almagro. The nickname comes from the rubber of bike inner tubes (filled with sand, and tied with wire at the ends) that this group used in some occasions to attack rival fans. Sometimes they would also throw objects at the players of rival teams to bother them when they should intervene in the game.

The barras became a traditional part of the Argentinian football crowds and evolved until, in the mid-1950s, they began receiving funding from football clubs to attend all the away matches. While intimidation towards referees and rival players and supporters was previously spontaneous, from that moment on it would be their main objective (along with encouraging their team). Another objective came to be defending the rest of spectators and players of their club from the attacks of rival fans (especially in away matches), and police repression, which increased fights and riots, that occurred more frequently before and after the matches outside of stadiums (although many also occurred on the terraces during the games, sometimes leading to their suspension). Thus, they became the first organized, violence-centered supporters' groups of football fans in the world (which later appeared as hooligan firms in United Kingdom, ultras in Italy and torcidas organizadas in Brazil).

Argentine journalist Amílcar Romero stated that, before the appearance of such groups, when a team played away, it was intimidated by home fans. Barras bravas were a response to this pressure, so each club started to have its own barra brava, financed by the club leadership. These groups were given tickets and paid travel to the stadiums, and access to these benefits were controlled by the group's main members. To obtain prestige, the member had to be violent.

In 1958, media has begun to notice the existence of barras bravas after the riots during a match between Vélez Sarsfield and River Plate (at José Amalfitani Stadium), at which 18-year-old bystander Alberto Mario Linker was killed by police (he was accidentally hit in the head by a tear gas grenade thrown at point-blank range from a grenade launcher) when cops tried to disperse River Plate fans who were causing unrest in a terrace located behind one of the goals. Police and rioters were criticized by the media, and newspaper La Razón mentioned the existence of barras fuertes (strong gangs) in Argentine football that were already known by many people, differentiating them for the first time from the traditional barras as being more organized, hierarchical, and coordinated, as observed among River Plate' rioters on that occasion.

Barra brava is the currently term appeared in Argentine media in the 1960s, but became popular in the 1980s. Until the early 1990s, barra brava members in Argentina rejected that term (many even today) for considering it pejorative, and prefer being denominated as fanbase/crowd's guides (largely because if a supporter group it's identified as a defined group of people that is involved in illegal acts, the Argentine justice can judge the members as participants of an illicit association, a legal figure that hardens the penalties).

Although there were many fights and riots carried out by fans since the beginnings of Argentine football, Argentinian players, club leaders, and police (with the first registered death caused by violence in 1923), the death of Alberto Mario Linker signaled the beginning of an era of habituation to violence. During the following decades, riots and deaths increased at the same time that barras bravas organized and multiplied.

According to some studies, Argentina has the most dangerous organized supporters' groups in the world. Through August 2012 Argentine football has experienced more than 200 deaths related to hooliganism. Since 2013, all visiting fans were banned from matches of the first division.

Characteristics 
These groups deploy and wave flags (that in Argentine football slang are called trapos -rags-), banners and umbrellas (with their team's uniforms), and use musical instruments (such as drums and, since the mid-2000s, trumpets) to accompany their chants. They occupy terraces where viewers must stand, while in all-seater stadiums (rare in Argentina), barras bravas also remain standing throughout the match.
The most characteristic flags are shaped like giant strips several meters in length (called trapos largos -long cloths- or tirantes -suspenders-), that are deployed from the top of the terrace to the bottom. Each group usually also has a banner with its name.

Traditionally, many members (usually important ones) stand upon the crush barriers that are placed in terraces to prevent crushing. In order to not fall from there, they hold on from a "suspender" (this was the purpose for making these flags shaped like strips), the body of someone else that is by his side and sustained to the flag, or the hand of some supporter that is standing below (in the floor).

They start and coordinate most of the chants, wave the most important flags, and always are located in the center of the terrace that they occupy. Until the group enters onto the terrace (usually a few minutes before or sometimes after the match starting), the center is not occupied by the crowd (even if the terrace it is almost filled). It is left empty to show respect for the place of the barra brava.

Originally these groups were not very numerous or powerful. Over the years, this changed to the point of cases where the barra brava decided who would be the club's chairman. Since the 1980s and 1990s, hooliganism has grown and some groups engaged in illegal activities such as extorting money from club leadership, players and hawkers that work at the stadium and surroundings, sell tickets (that are given by club leaders) to matches on the black market, charge for parking in the vicinity of the stadium, etc. Many members also steal (participating in burglaries, larcenies and robberies, sometimes even being part of criminal organizations) or sell drugs as a way to obtain money for travels (club leaders don't pay the travel for the whole group when the destination is too far), the making of flags or buying elements (balloons, confetti, pyrotechnics, etc.) used in the team's receptions on the pitch. They often provide services to political and union leaders who hire them as agitator groups (during rallies and mass meetings, that in Argentina traditionally have people chanting like football crowds, playing drums and even shooting firecrackers), goon squads (clashing with supporters of other political parties, unions or police during demonstrations, protests, rallies and strikes), bodyguards, etc.

They are funded also by club leadership, which may give salaries to some members or even a percentage of the profits. Also, when the stadium of some club is used for a non-football event (like concerts), usually the club's barra brava members are employed as security guards to take care of the facilities.

In Argentina, since the 2000s, a large percentage of deaths related to football were related to internal disputes within barras bravas, emerging subgroups into it that sometimes even had its own names.

The size of a barra brava is generally related to the level of the club's popularity. However, some clubs have big supporters' groups without being very popular (this usually occurs when the club has, at least, a relatively high popularity in a high populated working class zone of an urban area). Group sizes range from a dozen of members in very small clubs, to more than a thousand in important ones (groups with several hundred of members or more started to appear in the 1980s -before that decade such groups weren't so big-), all of them with a hierarchical structure that gets stronger and more complex when the group's size is bigger. There are also many small clubs (with very few fans) that don't have a barra brava.

See also 
 Association football culture
 Casuals
 Curva
 Hooliganism
 Major football rivalries
 Supporters' groups
 Torcida organizada
 Ultras

References

External links 
 In Fútbol-Mad Argentina, Ms. Rubeo Teaches Soccer Fans to Play Nice
 Miami Ultras Soccer Fans
 Documentary about Barra Bravas in Buenos Aires
 Barra Brava Website 

Association football culture
Gangs in Argentina